Logan County is the name of ten current counties and one former county in the United States:

 Logan County, Arkansas 
 Logan County, Colorado 
 Logan County, Idaho (1889–1895)
 Logan County, Illinois 
 Logan County, Kansas 
 Logan County, Kentucky 
 Logan County, Nebraska 
 Logan County, North Dakota 
 Logan County, Ohio 
 Logan County, Oklahoma 
 Logan County, West Virginia

See also
 Logan Shire, Queensland, Australia; predecessor to Logan City
 Logan Township (disambiguation)
 Logan (disambiguation)